R328 road may refer to:
 R328 road (Ireland)
 R328 road (South Africa)